Willi Kirsei (3 December 1902 – 20 December 1963) was a German international footballer.

With 244 goals for Hertha Berlin, he is the club's record goalscorer.

References

1902 births
1963 deaths
Association football forwards
German footballers
Germany international footballers
Hertha BSC players